Pterostylis xerophila, commonly known as the desert greenhood, is a plant in the orchid family Orchidaceae and is endemic to South Australia. Both flowering and non-flowering plants have a relatively large rosette of leaves. Flowering plants also have up to eight translucent white, green and reddish-brown flowers with an insect-like labellum.

Description
Pterostylis xerophila is a terrestrial, perennial, deciduous, herb with an underground tuber and a rosette of between three and ten leaves. Flowering plants have a rosette at the base of the flowering stem but the leaves are usually withered by flowering time. Flowering occurs from September to November.

Taxonomy and naming
Pterostylis xerophila was first formally described in 1986 by Mark Clements from a specimen grown in Adelaide from material collected in the Great Victoria Desert. The description was published in the fourth edition of the Flora of South Australia. The specific epithet (xerophila) is derived from the Ancient Greek words ξερός (xeros), meaning “dry” and φίλος (phílos), meaning "dear one" or "friend".

Its common name as listed on the Commonwealth's SPRAT database is desert greenhood.

Distribution and habitat

Conservation
Pterostylis xerophila  is classified as "vulnerable" under the Australian Government Environment Protection and Biodiversity Conservation Act 1999 and the South Australian Government National Parks and Wildlife Act 1972. Little is known about the threats to this greenhood but include grazing by feral rabbits and goats, weed invasion, accidental destruction by vehicle movement and inappropriate fire regimes.

References

xerophila
Endemic orchids of Australia
Orchids of South Australia
Plants described in 1986